Ronnel Jake Antonio Padilla (born January 22, 1989) is a Filipino former actor and comedian. He starred in the 2014 film Sa Ngalan ng Ama, Ina at Mga Anak and also appeared in La Visa Loca. He is the son of Rommel Padilla and Annabelle Antonio, brother of Matt Padilla and Roanna Padilla and half-brother of Daniel Padilla.

Career and personal life
Padilla's career began in 2005, where he first appeared in Robin Padilla's movie, La Visa Loca.  

In 2011, he became one of the participants in ABS-CBN's reality show Pinoy Big Brother: Unlimited.  

Padilla transferred to GMA Network in 2012. he worked with Dennis Trillo and Marian Rivera in the Philippine adaptation of Korean drama Temptation of Wife.  

Before joining the gag show Bubble Gang, his final project in ABS-CBN is Apoy Sa Dagat where he portrayed the role of young Anton in 2013.  

He is married to his longtime partner, Rosalie Bianca Abdelsayed on October 18, 2015. They have two children named Raniaah Amira (born 2013) and Royce Aaliyah (born 2016).

In 2017, Padilla left the showbiz industry and migrated to Australia with his family.

Filmography

Television

Films

References

External links

1989 births
Living people
RJ
Filipino male television actors
Filipino male film actors

Filipino male comedians
Participants in Philippine reality television series
Pinoy Big Brother contestants
ABS-CBN personalities
GMA Network personalities